Ellen Mattson (born 22 September 1962) is a Swedish writer. Her first fictional work to be published in English translation was Snow (2005), a historical novel set in the early 18th century.

She has won several literary prizes, including the Svenska Dagbladet Literature Prize in 1998, the Dobloug Prize in 2009, and the Selma Lagerlöf Prize in 2011.

On 28 March 2019, the Swedish Academy elected Mattson as a new member of the academy. She was inducted in December 2019.

Selected works 
 Truman Capote och faktaromanen (Examensarbete vid Högskolan i Borås) 1989
 Nattvandring 1992
 Vägen härifrån 1994
 Resenärerna 1998
 Poetens liv 1999
 Snö 2001 (en historisk roman som utspelar sig i tidigt 1700-tal)
 Splendorville 2004
 Arves hus 2005
 Glädjestranden 2008
 Vinterträdet 2012

References 

1962 births
Living people
People from Uddevalla Municipality
Swedish women novelists
Swedish historical novelists
Writers from Bohuslän
Women historical novelists
Dobloug Prize winners
Members of the Swedish Academy